Senator Woodson may refer to:

J. Belmont Woodson (1872–1963), Virginia State Senate
Jamie Woodson (born 1972), Tennessee State Senate